Liam Manning (born 20 August 1985) is an English football manager and coach. He is currently the Head Coach of EFL League One club Oxford United.

Playing career
Manning played for the academy of his local side Norwich City before joining Ipswich Town in 2002, where he spent a year as a professional before being released in 2005. Following his release from Ipswich, Manning dropped into non-league, playing for Bishop's Stortford, Long Melford and Leiston, before enjoying a brief spell playing in Iceland for Selfoss. 

Upon his return from Iceland, Manning re-signed for Leiston, playing for the club between 2006 and 2008. Manning later returned to Woodbridge, followed by spells with Wroxham, Melton St Audrey and Ipswich Wanderers, before retiring from football to concentrate on coaching.

Management and coaching

Early coaching career
Manning worked as an academy coach at Ipswich Town before joining Premier League side West Ham United in 2015 as head coach of the club's U23s.

In 2019 he left to join City Football Group, initially as Director of Coaching with Major League Soccer side New York City FC before later progressing to the role of Academy Director.

Lommel SK
Staying within City Football Group, in July 2020 Manning was named head coach of Belgian First Division B club Lommel SK, where he led the previously bottom of the table side to a third-placed finish at the end of the 2020–21 season.

Milton Keynes Dons
On 13 August 2021, Manning joined League One club Milton Keynes Dons. On 8 October 2021, after just eleven league games in charge, Manning was named EFL League One Manager of the Month for September 2021, a month in which he led the club to an unbeaten run of five league games achieving eleven points. He repeated the achievement just four months later, being named League One Manager of the Month for January 2022 after a similarly successful period.

At the end of his first season, Manning had led the club to a third-place finish with 89 points and play-off qualification, having missed out on automatic promotion by a single point. The club however later failed to gain promotion via the play-offs, losing out to Wycome Wanderers over two semi-final legs.

Following an awful start to the season that found his side in the relegation zone, Manning was sacked on 11 December 2022 having accumulated just fifteen points from twenty matches, six points from safety and only off the bottom on goal difference.

Oxford United
On 11 March 2023, Manning was appointed Head Coach of League One side Oxford United.

Coaching style
Manning favours a high possession, high pressing style of football.

He has a reputation for developing young players, having spent much of his early coaching career working with the academy sides of West Ham United, Ipswich Town and New York City FC. Manning is credited as having contributed to the development of England international Declan Rice.

Career statistics

Managerial record

Honours
Individual
EFL League One Manager of the Month: September 2021, January 2022

References

External links

English football managers
Living people
1985 births
Association football coaches
English expatriate sportspeople in Belgium
English expatriate sportspeople in Iceland
English footballers
English expatriate football managers
Ipswich Town F.C. players
Bishop's Stortford F.C. players
Long Melford F.C. players
Leiston F.C. players
Woodbridge Town F.C. players
Selfoss men's football players
Wroxham F.C. players
Ipswich Wanderers F.C. players
Expatriate football managers in Belgium
Expatriate footballers in Iceland
Ipswich Town F.C. non-playing staff
West Ham United F.C. non-playing staff
New York City FC non-playing staff
Lommel S.K. managers
Milton Keynes Dons F.C. managers
Oxford United F.C. managers
Belgian First Division B managers
English Football League managers
Footballers from Norwich
Association football midfielders